John Earp (born Q1 1860) was an English footballer who played as a forward. Born in Newport, Shropshire, he played for Newton Heath (now Manchester United) between 1885 and 1888. As well as an appearance in an FA Cup match against Fleetwood Rangers in October 1886, he also played in 10 Manchester Senior Cup matches, scoring one goal. He played as an outside right against Fleetwood Rangers, but he could equally play as an inside forward, centre-forward or as a wing half.

References

External links
Profile at StretfordEnd.co.uk
Profile at MUFCInfo.com

1860 births
English footballers
Manchester United F.C. players
Year of death missing
Association football forwards